Dargai is one of the tehsils of Malakand District (the other being Batkhela) in Pakistan's northwestern Khyber Pakhtunkhwa province. It located on the main highway from Peshawar to Swat, Dir and Chitral.

The town of Dargai is experiencing an economic revival due to its well-known status as a hub for trade between the upper regions of Pakistan and the lower regions of Khyber Pakthunkhwa. It is also acknowledged economically as a major market for timber and historically as the last train station into Northern Pakistan.

Dargai was part of the Malakand Agency Tribal area until 1970 when the former princely states of Chitral, Dir, and Swat were amalgamated into the Malakand Division, which was in turn divided into districts, one of which was the Malakand Protected Area, known as Malakand District. In 2000 the Malakand Division was abolished and despite constitutional changes since 1970, the expression "Malakand Agency" is sometimes still used as a name for the entire area of the former agency.

History
The British commenced their campaign against Malakand in 1852, and Dargai became well known for its battles during their rule. First, the British conducted a campaign against the Pashtun Utmankhel tribe and a large battle took place at Prang Ghar. Owing to its defenders being only a small band of poorly armed mujahideen, the Utmankhel were subdued. In March 1852, a brigade was sent after them under the command of Lord Clyde, which raided Dargai and Kharkai – small villages of the Ranizai tribe at the bottom of the Malakand Pass. The attackers were well equipped with artillery, so the Ranizais accepted a ransom of Rs.5000 and thereafter proclaimed jihad or holy war in the Buner Valley, at that time ruled by Syed Akhbar Shah Badshah. The British felt threatened by Badshah and made an unsuccessful attempt to take the valley.

Swat ruler Akhund Sahib (Saidu baba) died in 1877, and the following year the British commander took a strong force and entered Ranizai territory via Palai and Sherkhana at the southern boundary of the Malakand Agency when the Ranizais once more resorted to arbitration.

In 1895, British army major Sir Arlo along with Colonel Kelly started a war against Umara Khan, a sardar and politician whom Winston Churchill called the Afghan Napoleon. The British camped at Dargai and Kharkai before a huge battle in the Malakand pass during which the Swat Ranizais displayed great valour. On September 12, 1895 an agreement was signed between the British and the Swat Ranizais.

The second battle of Malakand took place in 1897 during a period of Swat Ranizais resistance when even the Pukhtoon women came out to fight. History records the valour of a woman belonging to a respectable family of Dehri Alladand who fought day and night as well as provided food and water to the mujahideen and who died with her sword drawn. She is buried on the outskirts of Dehri Alladand village where the people refer to her as Shaheeda Abai (martyred grandmother).

Hazrat Sadullah Khan, alias Sar tor Faqir ("bear-headed Faqir"), also known as Mullah Mastan or the Mad Mullah by the British, was a tribesman of the Buner Swat. When the British seized Amandara, Sar tor Faqir marched from Landakay towards Thana the British proceeded to Dehri Alladand and the Batkhela. They by-passed the British troops at Amandara and decided to raid Malakand, where they defeated the British. Later, the Sikhs joined the British, but still they were still beaten by the mujadeen'. When the battle ended a large number of British and Sikhs had been killed or captured, and a large quantity of arms and ammunition seized. Nineteen mujahideen were killed, including Sar Tor Faqir. His tomb stands at the bottom of Elephant Pass (Hathi Darrah) to the south of the village of Zulamkot in Dehri Alladand in Malakand.

Later on, the British formed a new force known as the Malakand Field Force to deal with the tribes of Malakand, a force in which Winston Churchill was a second lieutenant. He was also the editor of the daily Civil and Military Gazette. The Malakand Field Force raided many villages in Malakand including Swat, Dir and Chitral. Thereafter British rule gradually enveloped the whole area.

In recent history, specifically November 2006, insurgents attacked a group of soldiers during their parade, many were killed and many more still were injured. The civilians in the surrounding area quickly drove the injured soldiers to the hospital thereby saving many lives. The people of Dargai are also known for providing water, refreshment, and even accommodation in their own homes to people fleeing the violence in the North from 2009-2012, and also to people escaping the floods in July 2010

Dargai Heights
An attack on Dargai Heights during the Tirah campaign resulted in the award of four Victoria Crosses. The Heights were held by Afridi tribesmen but were successfully stormed by the Gordon Highlanders and the 2nd King Edward VII's Own Gurkha Rifles on 20  October 1897. Piper George Findlater and Private Edward Lawson of the Gordons, Henry Singleton Pennell of the Derbyshire Regiment and Samuel Vickery of The Dorsetshire Regiment were medal recipients. The action was commemorated in verse by William McGonagall, the pipe march The Heights of Dargai by J. Wallace and the fiddle tune Dargai'' by James Scott Skinner. Richard Thompson later arranged and recorded a version of the Skinner tune for the guitar, released on the 1975 album Pour Down Like Silver.

Local attractions and Malakand Hydropower Projects
The two power houses at Dargai and Jabban have recently been supplemented by a third  81 MW facility Malakand-III hydropower station completed in 2008. The Punjab Regimental Centre is located near Dargai Railway Station.

Transport 
Dargai railway station was operational till 1992. Nowshera–Dargai Branch Line connected it with main railway system.

See also 
 Batkhela
 Malakand

References 

Populated places in Malakand District